Levente Molnár (born 10 March 1976), is a Hungarian-Romanian actor, most notable for playing Abraham in the Academy Award-winning film, Son of Saul. He is a Member of the European Film Academy (EFA).

In 1997, he acted at the Gheorgheni-based Figura Studio, and, from 1998 and 2002, was part of the Faculty of arts at the Babeș-Bolyai University, and studied acting at the Theatre Arts Department, in the class of András Hatházi.

After graduating, Molnár became a member of the Hungarian Theatre of Cluj and started teaching acting at the Babeș-Bolyai University In addition to roles in theatre, he took part, in 2002 and 2003, movement theatre performances based on choreography by Melinda Jakab at the Gheorghe Dima Music Academy. He regularly participates in various international dance, movement and theatre arts workshops.

He has had several film roles, including Grey Nobodies by István Kovács, Tabula Rasa by Sándor Csoma, Genezis by Árpád Bogdán, Tall Tales by Attila Szász, Captives by Kristóf Deák, Morgen by Marian Crisan and in the László Nemes-directed multiple award-winning film Son of Saul and Sunset.

Molnár speaks Hungarian and Romanian fluently, English at an advanced level, and German at an intermediate level.

Filmography

Theature
Nem bírtok játszani rajtam (Anton Pavlovics Csehov: Hattyúdal és Lakodalom című művei nyomán) – Zsigalov (college role)
Rainer Werner Fassbinder: A digó – Erich (college role)
Christopher Hampton: Veszedelmes viszonyok – Danceny (college role)
Hugo von Hofmannsthal: Jedermann – Akárki (college role)
Szomory Dezső: Május – Öngyilkos (college role)
Sütő András: Káin és Ábel – Ádám, 2000
Éjszakák az ezeregyből – Kászib fia, 2002
Egressy Zoltán: Kék, kék, kék – Fil, 2002
S. Anski nyomán: Fehér tűz, fekete tűz – Michael, Aszriel segédje, illetve Második batlán, 2001
Ion Luca Caragiale: Farsang – Iordache, Girimea segédje, 2002
Carlo Goldoni: A komédiaszínház – Színházi szolga, akik nem jutnak szóhoz, 2002
William Shakespeare: Téli rege – XXX, 2003
Benjamin Britten – Visky András – Selmeczi György: A vasárnapi iskola avagy Noé bárkája – Ábel, illetve Ábel, 2003
Christopher Marlowe: Doktor Faustus tragikus históriája – Bíboros, 2003
Pantagruel sógornője (Hommage Rabelais) – Szereplő, 2003
Luigi Pirandello: Öltöztessük fel a mezteleneket – Franco Laspiga, volt sorhajóhadnagy, 2004
Henrik Ibsen: A vadkacsa – Kedélyes vendég, 2004
Paul Portner: Hajmeresztő – Tony Whitcomb, a Hajmeresztô szalon tulajdonosa, 2004
Barabás Olga: Krimi – Tommy Marston, 2004
Carlo Goldoni: Velencei terecske – Zorzetto, a fia, 2005
Georg Büchner: Woyzeck – Katona, 2005
Feketeszemű rózsák – Vőfély, 2005
Visky András: Tanítványok – Máté, 2005
Bertolt Brecht: Kispolgári nász – A barát, 2006
Visky András: Hosszú péntek – Pörge, 2006
Énekek éneke – Az éj várfalainak őre, 2007
Giacomo Puccini: Gianni Schicchi – Egy árny, 2007
Thomas Bernhard: A vadásztársaság – Első miniszter, 2008
Henrik Ibsen: Peer Gynt – Begriffendelt professzor, Pincér, Manó illetve Falubeli, 2008
Danilo Kiš: Borisz Davidovics síremléke – Fegyukin vizsgálóbíró, 2008
Anton Pavlovics Csehov: Három nővér – Fedotyik, Alexej Petrovics hadnagy, 2008
William Shakespeare: III. Richárd – Sir Richárd Ratcliff, 2008
Georg Büchner: Danton halála – Hermann, a Forradalmi Törvényszék elnöke, 2009
Peca Ştefan – Andreea Vălean – Radu Apostol – Gianina Cărbunariu: Verespatak – Szereplő, 2010
Marin Držic: Dundo Maroje – Ribillió Rómában – Popiva, Maro szolgája, 2011
Albert Camus: Caligula – Helicon, 2011
Felméri Cecília – Lakatos Róbert: Drakulatúra – Szereplő, 2011
Friedrich Dürrenmatt: A fizikusok – Ernst Heinrich Ernesti, más néven Einstein, páciens, 2012
Móricz Zsigmond: Nem élhetek muzsikaszó nélkül – Peták, mindenes, 2013
Bohumil Hrabal: Őfelsége pincére voltam – Tichota úr, kerekesszékes hoteltulajdonos, Gestapo, ill. Nagykövet, 2013
Roger Vitrac: Viktor, avagy a gyermekuralom – Mária, szobalány, A doktor, ill. A néma hölgy, 2013
Stephen Sondheim: Sweeney Todd – Jonas Fogg, 2014
Nagy Ignác – Parti Nagy Lajos: Tisztújítás – Farkasfalvy, alispán, 2014
Friedrich Dürrenmatt: Az öreg hölgy látogatása – Festő, 2015

References

External links
Official website

1976 births
Living people
Hungarian male film actors